Annalong is a seaside village in County Down, Northern Ireland at the foot of the Mourne Mountains. Annalong is in the civil parish of Kilkeel, the barony of Mourne, and the Newry and Mourne District Council area.  It had a population of 1,805 at the 2011 Census. The village formerly exported dressed granite and is now a fishing and holiday resort.

History
On 13 January 1843, fishing boats from Newcastle and Annalong set out for the usual fishing stations but were caught in a gale. Fourteen boats were lost in the heavy seas, including a boat that had come to the rescue. Only two boats survived, the Victoria and the Brothers. In all, 76 men perished, 30 of them from Annalong.

It is estimated that around 250 men from Annalong served in the Great War (1914-1918). These men were all volunteers, as conscription was only introduced in Great Britain, not Ireland.

Facilities
Some of Annalong's businesses and public offices and organizations are on Main Street, while others are on the main road to Kilkeel and Newcastle.  Annalong Primary School is in the village and Annalong Community Development Association was established in 1994.  A new Irish language and cultural centre Páirc na Mara was opened in 2012 by Conradh na Gaeilge Boirche Íochtar, the Lower Mourne branch of The Gaelic League, and was extended in 2014. There are many old cottages and houses in the harbour area. New estates have been built on the outskirts of the village.

Places of interest
Annalong Cornmill was built in the 19th century and operated until the 1960s, and was one of the last working watermills in Northern Ireland. It contains a grain drying kiln and three pairs of millstones. It is powered by a 15 ft water wheel and a 1920s Marshall "hot-bulb" 20hp engine. Restoration began in 1983 after it was acquired by Newry and Mourne District Council, and it reopened in 1985.
In Annalong, there is a family farm that sells goods every day of the week. The farm is named Moneydarragh Farm. It is mainly run by the Purdy family. They are known for their potatoes. The potatoes are known as "Purdy's Pink Potatoes".
Annalong harbour was enlarged in the 1880s to cope with the increased granite exports. A purpose-built standard gauge railway was; built from Annalong to transport almost all of the material for the construction of the reservoir.
The Rocket Tower, situated at Cowden's yard on the Kilkeel side of Annalong, is a listed building. Despite being derelict, it is believed to be the only rocket station remaining in Ireland. The tower housed the pigeons, which were used as couriers between the Coastguard stations, and the garage housed a rocket launcher that fired ropes to boats that ran aground during the smuggling in the 18th–19th centuries.
Annalong Mural Project is a mural painted by pupils from Annalong Primary School and St. Mary's Glasdrumman depicting the area of the Mournes on Main Street. It was created in a cross-community effort between the two schools.

Notable People 
Francis Rawdon Chesney (1789–1872), Army general; Chesney was born in Annalong. At age 25, he was honoured for saving the lives of several local fishermen who were caught in a storm. He was a British soldier, an explorer in Asia ,and was able to demonstrate that the Suez Canal was a feasible project, bringing about its eventual construction. He also proved that the Tigris and Euphrates rivers were navigable, advocating the adoption of a route to India via the Euphrates.
Elizabeth Shane (1877–1951), a poet, lived her last years at Glassdrummond House near Annalong.

Demography

2011 Census 
On census day (27 March 2011) there were 1,805 people living in Annalong. Of those:

 20.8% were aged under 16 years and 15.8% were aged 5 and over;
 The average age was 38 years (Northern Ireland average 37.6);
 50.1% of the population were male and 49.9% were female;
 29.8% were from a Catholic background, and 64% were from a Protestant background;
 5.2% of people aged 16–74 were unemployed;
 21.4% of the population had no access to a car or van.

2001 Census
Annalong is classified by the Northern Ireland Statistics and Research Agency (NISRA) as a village (i.e. it has a population between 1,000 and 2,250 people). On census day (29 April 2001) there were 1,778 people living in Annalong. Of these:
23.8% were aged under 16 and 19.1% were aged 60 and over;
the average age was 36.2 years (Northern Ireland average age 35.8 years);
50.1% of the population were male and 49.9% were female;
25.9% were from a Catholic background, and 71.8% were from a Protestant background;
3.1% of people aged 16–74 were unemployed.
7.5% of the local population had access to a car or van.

Religion

Annalong Presbyterian Church is situated on the main Newcastle to Kilkeel road. It was established in 1840, and the Meeting House was ready for use by 1842. Kilhorne Church of Ireland is located on Kilkeel road. It is approached by a short driveway, with the tower visible from the road. There is also a Gospel Hall along Glasdrumman Road and a Free Presbyterian Worship Temple on Moneydarragh Road. Roman Catholics in the village usually attend St. Mary's Glasdrumman, as there are no Catholic churches in the village.

Sport 

Annalong is represented by two football clubs. These were formerly based on Protestant and Catholic origin; however, both teams are now more religiously mixed due to decreasing religious tensions in Northern Ireland. One is Annalong Football Club, which field two teams in the S.K Holmes league whilst the other is Mourne Rovers, which also participate in the S.K Holmes league. Andy McCormick was the manager for many years and contributed greatly to the soccer scene in Annalong. Most players for the Mourne Rovers also play for local Gaelic teams. 

Annalong also has a canoe and kayak club named Annalong Canoe and Kayak Club (ACKC), which uses Kilkeel Leisure Centre each Tuesday night for canoe polo and learning vital boating skills. This club also has camping trips, which members of the club and their families attend. These trips include paddling in Canadian canoes, surfing, or kayaking.

Annalong Outdoor Bowling Club is the village's bowling club.

Schools 
Annalong Primary School
St. Mary's Primary School

See also 

List of villages in Northern Ireland
List of towns in Northern Ireland

References

External links 
Annalong.com website

Villages in County Down
Civil parish of Kilkeel